Nomsa Josephina Kubheka (born 29 December 1970) is a South African politician and a Member of the National Assembly of South Africa. She is a member of the African National Congress.

Parliamentary career
A member of the African National Congress, Kubheka stood as an ANC parliamentary candidate from the Free State in the 2019 general election and was subsequently elected to the National Assembly and sworn in on 22 May 2019. In June 2019, she was named to the Portfolio Committee on Communications.

In February 2020, Kubheka was part of a delegation of ten female ANC MPs that went to Public Protector Busisiwe Mkhwebane's Pretoria residence to "offer support". She said:

References

External links

Profile at Parliament of South Africa

Living people
1970 births
Members of the National Assembly of South Africa
Women members of the National Assembly of South Africa
African National Congress politicians